Rue J. Alexander (October 4, 1889 – January 2, 1949) was a politician from the U.S. state of Indiana. Between 1948 and 1949 he served as Lieutenant Governor of Indiana.

Life
Rue Alexander was born in Talbot, Benton County in Indiana. He attended the Lafayette Business College and until 1915 he worked on a farm. Afterwards he became an automobile and tractor salesman. In 1918, during the last year of World War I, he joined the United States Army where he served in the motor transportation corps. After the war he became water superintendent at Boswell. Later he was a salesman for a Feed Company. He finally founded his own Feed Company which he named Pine Village Feeding Company.

Alexander joined the Republican Party. Between 1943 and 1947 he was the Secretary of State of Indiana. After the resignation of Lieutenant Governor Richard T. James he was appointed to this office to complete the unfinished term. As Lieutenant Governor he was the deputy of governor Ralph F. Gates and he presided over the Indiana Senate. He served in this position between April 14, 1948 and January 2, 1949 when he died. His death occurred just a few days before the end of his term on January 10.

External links
 Biographie at Freepages.genealogy – Rootsweb.ancestry
 Online Biography 

1889 births
1949 deaths
People from Benton County, Indiana
United States Army personnel of World War I
Businesspeople from Indiana
Secretaries of State of Indiana
Lieutenant Governors of Indiana
Indiana Republicans
20th-century American businesspeople